John Knight (12 September 1922 – 28 January 1996) was an English professional footballer who played as an inside forward.

References

External links
Jackie Knight career stats at Post-War Players Database

1922 births
1996 deaths
Footballers from Bolton
English footballers
Association football midfielders
Burnley F.C. players
Preston North End F.C. players
Chesterfield F.C. players
Exeter City F.C. players
English Football League players